Henry Samuel Bienen (born 1939) is an American academic and administrator. He was named President of the Poetry Foundation in 2015, and is President Emeritus of Northwestern University, where he served from 1995 to 2009.

Life and career
Bienen received a bachelor's degree with honors from Cornell University in 1960. He then received a master's degree in 1961 and a Ph.D. in 1966, both from the University of Chicago. In 1998, he was elected a Fellow of the American Academy of Arts and Sciences. He received the University of Chicago Professional Achievement Alumni Award in 2000.

Bienen served as dean of the Woodrow Wilson School of Foreign Policy at Princeton University. During his early academic career, he was a respected analyst of ethnic conflict and the influence of the military and of violence on development in the third world and especially Africa.  He was director of Princeton's Center of International Studies during 1985–92. Bienen also served on the Board of Directors of Bear Stearns beginning in 2004 until that firm's collapse during the financial crisis of 2008.

Bienen was a consultant to the US Department of State from 1972 to 1988, to the National Security Council from 1978 to 1979, to the CIA from 1982 to 1988, and to the World Bank from 1981 to 1989.

In 1995, Bienen succeeded Arnold R. Weber as president of Northwestern. During President Bienen's tenure, Northwestern underwent many changes.

Early on in his presidency, a strong undergraduate movement emerged calling on the university to add Asian American studies. The movement took a number of actions including a hunger strike, after facing resistance from the Northwestern Administration. Northwestern ultimately created the department after a few years of campus activity. In addition, Northwestern's athletic program had many successes during Bienen's term. Northwestern's football program, which historically had not been as strong as other Big Ten teams, improved.  The team appeared in five bowl games during Bienen's tenure, including a 1996 trip to the Rose Bowl, its first in nearly fifty years.

Under his leadership, Northwestern embarked on a large fundraising campaign resulting in the construction of major new buildings on both the Evanston and Chicago campuses. Additions to the Evanston campus included the Center for Nanofabrication and Molecular Self-Assembly; the Ford Motor Company Engineering Design Center; and the McCormick Tribune Center, home to the Medill School of Journalism; and the Arthur and Gladys Pancoe-Evanston Northwestern Healthcare Life Sciences Pavilion.  During Bienen's term The International Center for Advanced Internet Research (ICAIR) was also created at Northwestern in conjunction with IBM and other corporate partners and, on its Chicago campus, Northwestern opened the Robert H. Lurie Medical Research Center. President Bienen's time at Northwestern was also marked by sometimes difficult relations with Evanston, with one lawsuit against the city of Evanston reaching the US Supreme Court. Northwestern's relations with Evanston's mayor Lorraine H. Morton were more positive than with other city councilmen.

Retirement From Northwestern University 
Bienen retired from his position as Northwestern University president on August 31, 2009, a decision announced by Patrick G. Ryan, chair of the university's board of trustees.

In September 2008, the Northwestern University School of Music was renamed the Henry and Leigh Bienen School of Music to honor President Bienen and his wife, Leigh Buchanan Bienen.
 
In December 2008, Morton O. Schapiro was named President Bienen's successor.

Poetry Foundation 
Bienen served as the president of The Poetry Foundation from December 2015 until his resignation on June 10, 2020, in the wake of a widely-panned response to criticisms of the Foundation.

References

External links 
Short biography of Bienen from northwestern.edu
"Has anyone seen our president?" A critical column of Bienen published in The Daily Northwestern by a vice president of the Associated Student Government
Henry Bienen to retire as Northwestern President
Profile of Henry Bienen Northwestern Magazine

1939 births
Cornell University alumni
Fellows of the American Academy of Arts and Sciences
Living people
Place of birth missing (living people)
Presidents of Northwestern University
University of Chicago alumni
United Football League (2009–2012) executives